The road signs of the Kingdom of the Netherlands (the Netherlands and six Dutch Caribbean islands), as well as Suriname, are regulated in the Reglement verkeersregels en verkeerstekens 1990, commonly abbreviated as RVV 1990.
While most previous signage, from the RVV 1966 (Dutch) remained legal and official, they have been updated / replaced. Some aren't official anymore and have lost legal validity, but most surviving old signs remained valid.

Speed restrictions

Priority

Road closed prohibition and mandatory

Signs giving positive instructions

Parking and stopping

Other signs giving orders

Traffic regulations

Built-up area

Warning Signs

Direction

Information

Retired signs (no longer used) 
Below, signs are withdrawn or replaced with new diagrams of the same meaning.

Attention signs

Priority

Road closed prohibition and mandatory

Traffic regulations

Warning Signs

Information

References

External links 
 Road Traffic Signs and Regulations in the Netherlands
 Official text of the Reglement verkeersregels en verkeerstekens 1990 
 Comprehensive overview of Dutch road signs 

Netherlands
Road transport in the Netherlands